Samuel Dana (June 26, 1767 – November 20, 1835) was an American lawyer and politician who served in both branches of the Massachusetts General Court, as President of the Massachusetts Senate and as a United States representative from Massachusetts.

Early life and education
Dana was born in Groton in the Province of Massachusetts Bay on June 26, 1767, the son of the clergyman Samuel and Anna (Kenrick) Dana.  Dana attended the local public schools and later studied law in the office of United States District Court Judge John Lowell, and was then admitted to the bar in 1789.

Career
Dana practiced law in Groton, Massachusetts and later in Charlestown, Massachusetts.  On October 14, 1811 Dana also was appointed as the Chief Justice of the Massachusetts Court of Common Pleas, he held that position for nine years.

Dana was appointed postmaster January 1, 1801, he served as a member of the Massachusetts House of Representatives in 1803 in the State senate and served as President of the Massachusetts Senate.  Dana served as attorney for Middlesex County from 1807 to 1811.

Member of Congress
Dana was elected as a Democratic-Republican to the Thirteenth Congress to fill the vacancy caused by the resignation of William M. Richardson.  Dana served from September 22, 1814 to March 3, 1815. Dana was an unsuccessful candidate for reelection in 1814 to the Fourteenth Congress.

Later life
After his congressional service Dana resumed the practice law.  Dana was a delegate to the State constitutional convention in 1820. Dana was again a member of the Massachusetts House of Representatives from 1825-1827.

Personal life
On December 5, 1795, Dana was married to Rebecca Barrett of New Ipswich, New Hampshire.  Together, they had eight children, including a son, James Dana.

Dana died in Charlestown, Massachusetts on November 20, 1835.    Dana was buried in Groton Cemetery.

References

External links

Massachusetts state senators
Massachusetts lawyers
Presidents of the Massachusetts Senate
Members of the Massachusetts House of Representatives
1767 births
1835 deaths
Democratic-Republican Party members of the United States House of Representatives from Massachusetts
People from Groton, Massachusetts
19th-century American lawyers